Annie Ki Ayegi Baraat is a 2012 Pakistani drama serial of the Kis Ki Aayegi Baraat franchise on Geo TV. It is directed by Marina Khan and Nadeem Beyg and written by Vasay Chaudhry. The drama had an ensemble cast consisting of Bushra Ansari, Hina Dilpazeer, Vasay Choudhary, Samina Ahmad, Manzoor Qureshi, Javed Sheikh, Saba Hameed, Huma Hameed, Behroze Sabzwari, Shakila Hassan, Laila Zuberi, Naveen Waqar, Alishba Yousuf, Shehzad Sheikh, Ahsan Khan, Ali Safina, Uroosa Siddiqui, Sana Askari, Natasha Ali and Raheel Butt.

The title song "Mitra Ve Mitra" was sung by Shazia Manzoor and Raju.

Synopsis 
After marriage, Takka and Sukki plan their honeymoon trip while Rabia's sister Arfa arrives to Pakistan with her daughter Annie. In efforts to find a suitable groom for Annie, the whole family gathers together. Uninterested in marriage, Annie takes up a job on a film set where she meets Meekal. On the other hand, inside Chaudary's household Saima is preparing for her boutique launch in Karachi while Chaudary Sahab is concerned as her sister Farry along with her son Bobby D arrives from abroad.

In efforts to get her son married to Annie, Farry sends a marriage proposal while Annie is left to make a choice between Meekal and Bobby. As family waits for Annie's decision, differences between Azar and Sila arises due to corporate jealousy. Unable to wrap her head around Vicky's plan of moving abroad, Saima Chaudary decides to stop him however Sila's friend Laila is confused between her fiancé Adeel and Vicky.

As wedding preparations of two couples are underway, an unexpected love story starts which leaves the families divided. In this comedy of errors, will everyone find their happy endings?

Cast 
 Bushra Ansari as Saima Chaudhary/Fehmida.
 Hina Dilpazeer as Farry Dharrala
 Samina Ahmed as Mehr Un Nisa
 Manzoor Qureshi as Khalid Bhanji
 Laila Zuberi as Mikaal's mother
 Javed Sheikh as Faraz
 Saba Hameed as Rabia Ahmed
 Huma Hameed as Arfa 
 Naveen Waqar as Annie
 Shehzad Sheikh as Mikaal
 Uroosa Siddiqui as Sukaina
 Ahsan Khan as Azar
 Ali Safina as Mushtaq (Takkay)
 Alishba Yousuf as Sila Chaudhary
 Asad Siddiqui as Vikky Chaudhary
 Sana Askari as Laila
 Sumbul Shahid as Mushtaq's mother
 Uroosa Siddiqui as Sukaina (Sukhi)
 Natasha Ali as Dolly
 Raheel Butt as Nabeel
 Syed Mohammad Ahmed as Nabeel's father
 Yasir Ali Khan as Adeel
 Vasay Chaudhary as Bobby D (Darrallah)
 Shehryar Zaidi as Chaudhary Nazeer Sahab
 Gohar Rasheed as Sila's boss and classmate in University
 Muhammad Aslam as Shahab (Servant)

References

External links 
 

Geo TV original programming
2012 Pakistani television series debuts
Pakistani comedy television series
Films directed by Nadeem Baig (director)